Luigi Ghedina (1829–1900) was an Italian decorative painter and decorator. A native of Cortina d'Ampezzo, he is perhaps best known for his 
frescoes on the ceiling of the Basilica Minore dei Santi Filippo e Giacomo of Cortina,  "Christ Purifying the Temple", "The Martyrdom of St. Philip and "The Beheading of St. James".

References

Bibliography 
 

Italian decorators
19th-century Italian painters
19th-century Italian male artists
Italian male painters
People from Cortina d'Ampezzo
1829 births
1900 deaths